The 1997 PBA All-Star Weekend is the annual all-star weekend of the Philippine Basketball Association (PBA). The All-Star Fans Day was held on July 25 at the Araneta Coliseum in Quezon City while the All-Star Game was held on July 27 at the Cuneta Astrodome in Pasay.

Skills Challenge Winners
Buzzer-Beater Contest: Tonyboy Espinosa (Mobiline)
Three-point Shootout: Roehl Gomez (Alaska)
Slam Dunk Team Competition: Tyrone Hopkins and Mike Orquillas (Gordon's Gin)

All-Star Game

Rosters

Rookies-Sophomores-Juniors:
Marlou Aquino (Gordon's Gin)
Nic Belasco (Pop Cola)
Jeffrey Cariaso (Mobiline)
Bal David (Gordon's Gin)
Kenneth Duremdes (Pop Cola)
Dennis Espino (Sta. Lucia)
Chris Jackson (Sta.Lucia)
Elmer Lago (Purefoods)
Jojo Lim (Shell)
Mike Mustre (San Miguel)
Andy Seigle (Mobiline)
Jason Webb (Sta.Lucia)
Coach: Norman Black (San Miguel)

Veterans:
Johnny Abarrientos (Alaska)
Nelson Asaytono (San Miguel)
Bonel Balingit (Pop Cola)
Cris Bolado (Purefoods)
Jerry Codiñera (Purefoods)
Rey Evangelista (Purefoods)
Vince Hizon (Gordon's Gin)
Noli Locsin (Gordon's Gin)
Vergel Meneses (Pop Cola)
Alvin Patrimonio (Purefoods)
Dindo Pumaren (Purefoods)
Bong Ravena (Purefoods)
Coach: Robert Jaworski (Ginebra)

Game

References

All-Star Weekend
Philippine Basketball Association All-Star Weekend